Willow Beach is located on the Arizona side of the Colorado River between Lake Mead and Lake Mohave. Both lakes are part of the Lake Mead National Recreation Area administered by the U.S. National Park Service.

Willow Beach was a trade major center  for Mojave and Virgin Ancestral Pueblo people along the routes between Coastal California and the American Southwest between 500 and 1200 CE.

Fish species
 Rainbow Trout
 Striped Bass
 Sunfish
 Catfish (Channel)
 Carp
 Razorback Sucker
 Bonytail Chub

Hatchery

Willow Beach is the location of the Willow Beach National Fish Hatchery which is run by the US Fish and Wildlife Service, Department of the Interior.

The hatchery produces Rainbow Trout for sport fishing. Rainbow Trout are stocked year round. The hatchery also raises Razorback Suckers and Bonytail Chub, both endangered species.

References

External links
 
 Willow Beach Marina and Campground
 Arizona Boating Locations Facilities Map
 Arizona Fishing Locations Map

Lake Mead National Recreation Area
Lake Mohave
Protected areas of Mohave County, Arizona